North, Central American and Caribbean records in athletics are the best marks set in an event by an athlete who competes for a member nation of the North American, Central American and Caribbean Athletic Association (NACAC).

Outdoor 
Key to tables:

+ = en route to a longer distance

h = hand timing

# = not ratified by national federation

A = affected by altitude

Mx = Mixed gender race

≠ = annulled by IAAF due to doping violation, but nevertheless ratified by USATF

a = aided road course according to IAAF rule 260.28

X = annulled due to doping violation

OT = oversized track (> 200m in circumference)

Men

Women

Mixed

Indoor

Men

Women

Notes

References
General
North, Central American and Caribbean Outdoor Records. NACAC 30 June 2021 updated
North, Central American and Caribbean Indoor Records. NACAC 31 January 2020 updated
Specific

External links 
NACAC web site
World Athletics: NACAC Records

NACAC